Pietà is a 2012 South Korean drama film written and directed by Kim Ki-duk. It depicts the mysterious relationship between a brutal man who works for loan sharks and a middle-aged woman who claims that she is his mother, mixing Christian symbolism and highly sexual content.

It made its world premiere in the competition line-up of the 69th Venice International Film Festival, where it won the Golden Lion. It is the first Korean film to win the top prize at one of the three major international film festivals—Venice, Cannes and Berlin.

The title refers to the Italian Pietà (piety/pity), signifying depictions of the Virgin Mary cradling the corpse of Jesus.

Plot

Kang-do leads a solitary life as a seemingly heartless and brutal debt collector for his clients, loan sharks who demand a 10x return on a one-month loan. To recover the massive interest, the debtors sign an insurance application for handicaps, and Kang-do injures them to file the claims.

On one such instance Kang-do visits Hun-cheol, who works in a decrepit factory with his wife Myeong-ja. The small loan he took out a month ago has snowballed into a much larger figure, and Kang-do arrives to cripple him and file the claim. In an act of desperation, Myeong-ja tries to seduce Kang-do by stripping, begging him to give them another week to get the money for the interest. Kang-do strips her to her bra, but refuses to have sex with her. He cripples Hun-cheol and files for the insurance.

Later, he notices he is being followed by a middle aged woman. She claims that she is his biological mother, who abandoned him 30 years ago, and introduces herself as Mi-sun. Despite initially pushing her away, Kang-do eventually lets her into his life and opens up to her, mellowing in the process. He is less harsh in pursuing interest, on one occasion refusing to injure a young factory worker who is about to become a father. Seemingly innocent on the surface, Kang-do's relationship with Mi-sun is disturbed by his abandonment anxiety and his life growing up without a mother figure, which manifests itself in sexual ways. Kang-do molests her, asking "I came out of here? Can I go back in?". Another time he tries to get into bed with her and put his face against her breasts. Both times he is pushed away and she is uncomfortable.

On an outing with his mother, Kang-do is childishly excited and whimsical. When insulted by a bystander, he almost gets into a physical altercation. They are followed home by one of the debtors Kang-do has crippled, who is now a beggar. The beggar holds Kang-do's mother hostage as revenge for crippling him, but is mortally wounded in the altercation. Frightened by the situation, Kang-do asks Mi-sun not to go outside without him for her safety.

As Kang-do's birthday approaches, Mi-sun fakes a kidnapping and leaves the house. It is revealed that she isn't actually Kang-do's biological mother, but the mother of a debtor Kang-do crippled in the past, who subsequently committed suicide. Not knowing this, Kang-do desperately chases every person he crippled in the past in order to find Mi-sun. He finds Myeong-ja and Hun-cheol, who now live on Myeong-ja's earnings from selling food on the side of a highway to live after Hun-cheol was left crippled and unable to work. Kang-do is forced to face the consequences of his job as a loan shark, as many of his debtors either die or live in poverty.

Mi-sun commits suicide in front of Kang-do, but expresses pity for him before doing so. After her death Kang-do realizes she isn't his mother, and buries her next to her son. Kang-do commits suicide by tying himself underneath Myeong-ja's truck, which she unknowingly drives, leaving behind a steady trail of his blood.

Cast
Lee Jung-jin as Lee Kang-do
Jo Min-su as Jang Mi-sun
Kang Eun-jin as Myeong-ja, Hun-cheol's wife
Woo Gi-hong as Hun-cheol
Cho Jae-ryong as Tae-seung
Lee Myeong-ja as Mother of man who committed suicide using drugs
Heo Jun-seok as Man who committed suicide
Kwon Se-in as Man with guitar
Song Mun-su as Man who committed suicide by falling
Kim Beom-jun as Myeongdong man
Son Jong-hak as Loan shark boss
Jin Yong-ok as Wheelchair man
Kim Seo-hyeon as Old woman
Yu Ha-bok as Container man
Seo Jae-gyeong as Kid
Kim Jae-rok as Monk
Lee Won-jang as Sang-gu, committed suicide by hanging
Kim Sun-mo as Jong-do's neighbour
Kang Seung-hyeon as neighbouring shop owner
Hwang Sun-hui as old woman

Themes

Violence and sexual content 
The film's depiction of the violence and sexuality between Kang-do and the woman who claims to be his long-lost mother have provoked intense reactions and is debated by critics. Some of the most controversial scenes in the film includes when Kang-do feeds the woman a piece of his own flesh from his thigh, and a scene when he molests her, and asking her "I came out of here? Can I go back in?". There is another subsequent scene when she gives Kang-do a handjob.

Release
Pietà premiered in competition at the Venice Film Festival on September 4, 2012. It received theatrical release in South Korea on September 6, 2012.

The film has been sold to 20 countries for international distribution, including Italy, Germany, Russia, Norway, Turkey, Hong Kong, and Greece. Independent distributor, Drafthouse Films is doing a theatrical release in North America.

It was Korea's Foreign Language Film submission to the 85th Academy Awards, but it did not make the final shortlist.

Reception
The film won the Golden Lion prize at the 69th Venice International Film Festival. At its Venice press screening, it reportedly "elicited extremely mixed reactions". Hollywood director Michael Mann, who presided over the jury, said the film stood out because it "seduced you viscerally."

The film holds a 72/100 on Metacritic, and Rotten Tomatoes reports 73% approval among 52 critics. Deborah Young of The Hollywood Reporter described it as "an intense and, for the first hour, sickeningly violent film that unexpectedly segues into a moving psychological study." Young gave high praises to the film's acting performances, however states "it's not an exaggeration to say there's not a single pleasant moment in the film's first half" and "Viewers will keep their eyes closed" for the majority of the film. Young further praised the visual style of the film with "Kim gives scenes a dark, hand-held look in which the frame edge disappears into black shadows. It's not a particularly attractive style but does reflect the ugliness of its subject."

Leslie Felperin of Variety describes it as the director's "most commercial pic in years" though it nonetheless features the director's usual trademarks of "brutal violence, rape, animal slaughter and the ingestion of disgusting objects." Felperin further states the film is a "blend of cruelty, wit and moral complexity."

Dan Fainaru of Screen International states "Starting with a grisly suicide and ending with a burial, this isn't an easy or pleasant film to watch."

Oliver Lyttelton of IndieWire praised the two lead actor's performances and their on-screen chemistry as mother and son: "there's a real tenderness to the two performances, particularly that of Lee, who reverts from a strong-and-silent brute to easing into the childhood that he never got to live. And the disturbing, vaguely Oedipal relationship at the core is a fascinating one..." However Lyttelton gave the film a C+, and criticizes "It's a shame then, that in the second half of the film, the twisted mother-son relationship shifts gears and becomes something closer to the kind of revenge movie that Korean cinema has become known for. It's not quite a full-on genre exercise, but it's probably the closest to such a thing that Kim's ever made, and while he has his own twists to provide, it's still a disappointingly conventional turn for the film to take."

Awards

Remake
Theal, a 2022 Indian action film directed by Harikumar, liberally adapts the film with the action set in India.

See also
 List of submissions to the 85th Academy Awards for Best Foreign Language Film
 List of South Korean submissions for the Academy Award for Best Foreign Language Film

References

External links
 
 
 
 

2012 films
South Korean crime thriller films
Films directed by Kim Ki-duk
Next Entertainment World films
Golden Lion winners
Best Picture Blue Dragon Film Award winners
Films about mother–son relationships
South Korean films remade in other languages
2010s South Korean films